Akyüz is a Turkish surname. Notable people with the surname include:

 Janet Akyüz Mattei, Turkish-American Jewish astronomer
 Murat Akyüz, Turkish footballer
 Serhat Akyüz, Turkish footballer

Turkish-language surnames